WNKX may refer to:

 WNKX-FM, a radio station (96.7 FM) licensed to Centerville, Tennessee, United States
 WMAK, a radio station (1570 AM) licensed to Centerville, Tennessee, which held the call sign WNKX from 1991 to 2013